A bowl barrow is a type of burial mound or tumulus. A barrow is a mound of earth used to cover a tomb. The bowl barrow gets its name from its resemblance to an upturned bowl. Related terms include cairn circle, cairn ring, howe, kerb cairn, tump and rotunda grave.

Description

Bowl barrows were created from the Neolithic through to the Bronze Age in Great Britain. A bowl barrow is an approximately hemispherical mound covering one or more Inhumations or cremations. Where the mound is composed entirely of stone, rather than earth, the term cairn replaces the word barrow. The mound may be simply a mass of earth or stone, or it may be structured by concentric rings of posts, low stone walls, or upright stone slabs. In addition, the mound may have a kerb of stones or wooden posts.

Barrows were usually built in isolation in various situations on plains, valleys and hill slopes, although the most popular sites were those on hilltops. Bowl barrows were first identified in Great Britain by John Thurnam (1810–73), an English psychiatrist, archaeologist, and ethnologist.

British bowl barrows

English Heritage proposed the following classification of British bowl barrows:
 Type 1: Kerbless and ditchless barrows
 Type 2: Kerbless with continuous ditch
 Type 3: Kerbless with penannular ditch
 Type 4: Kerbless with segmented ditch
 Type 5: Kerbed but ditchless
 Type 6: Kerbed with continuous ditch
 Type 7: Kerbed with pennanular ditch
 Type 8: Kerbed with segmented ditch
 Type 9: Structured but ditchless
 Type 10: Structured with continuous ditch
 Type 11: Structured with penannular ditch
 Type 12: Structured with segmented ditch

Tump

Tump is Worcestershire dialect term for a small hill, such as a barrow, even a large barrow such as the Whittington Tump in the village of Whittington south east of Worcester, or an "unty tump" meaning mole hill (unty being Worcestershire dialect for a mole). It is related to the  Welsh language term Twmpath which was once applied to the mound or village green. From a short list of tumps, it can be seen that the term is used extensively in the Welsh Marches and its use extends beyond that, to Somerset, Wiltshire, Oxfordshire, and Buckinghamshire.

See also
Devil's Humps, Stoughton

References

External links
 Monument Class Description - Bowl Barrows
 British Burial Barrows: Bowl Barrows

Bronze Age Britain
Types of monuments and memorials
Stone Age Britain
Barrows in England